Wenzhou University (WZU) is a comprehensive public university in Wenzhou city, Zhejiang province, China.

History 
Wenzhou University was founded through the amalgamation of Wenzhou Normal College established in 1956 and the former Wenzhou University, which was established in 1984.

Campuses 
The two main campuses of the university are in Wenzhou’s Chashan University Town, an area surrounded by green mountains and rivers.

WZU has with a total area of 1.7 square kilometers (419 acres), and the housing area is 820,000 square meters. The library has a collection of approximately 1.59 million volumes.

Administration

Faculty 
The number of faculty members, administrative and supporting staff is 1,950, which 1,310 are full-time teachers (including 167 professors, 448 associate professors), 181 are mentors for postgraduates and doctorate students, and 201 are academics.

Students 
The university has a full-time student population of 24,960.

Schools and departments 
There are 20 departments or colleges at the university:
School of Business
College of Law and Politics
College of Physical Education
College of Humanity
College of Foreign Languages
College of Teacher Education
College of Music
Institute of Art and Design
College of Mathematics and Information Science
College of Physics and Electric Information
College of Chemistry and Materials Science
College of Life and Environmental Science
College of Mechanical and Electrical Engineering
College of Computer Science and Engineering
College of Architecture and Civil Engineering
Fashion Institute
College of Adult and Further Education
Ou Jiang College
College of International Cooperation
City College

References

External links
Wenzhou University Official website 
Wenzhou University Official website 

 
Education in Wenzhou
Universities and colleges in Zhejiang
Educational institutions established in 1984
1984 establishments in China